The Department of Computer Science at the University of Manchester is the longest established department of Computer Science in the United Kingdom and one of the largest. It is located in the Kilburn Building on the Oxford Road and currently has over 800 students taking a wide range of undergraduate and postgraduate courses and 60 full-time academic staff.

Teaching and study

Undergraduate
The Department currently offers a wide range of undergraduate courses from Bachelor of Science (BSc), Bachelor of Engineering (BEng) and Master of Engineering (MEng). These are available as single honours or as joint honours degrees within the themes of Artificial Intelligence, Computer Science, Computer systems engineering, Software engineering, Mathematics,  Internet Computing, Business applications and Management. Industrial placements are offered with all undergraduate courses.

Postgraduate
At postgraduate level the department offers taught Master of Science (MSc) degrees, at an advanced level and also through a foundation route. Research degrees, Doctor of Philosophy (PhD) and Master of Philosophy (MPhil) are available as three and four year programmes through the Doctoral Training Centre in Computer Science, the first of its kind in the UK.

Notable academic staff
Notable academic staff include:
 Andy Brass
 Jack Dongarra
 Steve Furber 
 Carole Goble 
 Toby Howard
 Norman Paton
 Steve Pettifer
 Ulrike Sattler
  Robert Stevens
  
 Andrei Voronkov

The School is organised into nine different research groups, which received funding from a wide range of sources including the European Union, Engineering and Physical Sciences Research Council and Biotechnology and Biological Sciences Research Council.

Advanced Processor Technologies
The Advanced Processor Technologies (APT) group researches advanced and novel approaches to processing and computation and is led by Professor Steve Furber. New projects include SpiNNaker, Transactional Memory, and TERAFLUX. Academic staff in the group include Dr Jim Garside, Dr David Lester, Dr , Dr John V Woods, Dr Javier Navaridas, Dr Vasilis Pavlidis, Dr Dirk Koch and Fellow Barry Cheetham. Past research projects include Jamaica, AMULET microprocessor, Network On Chip, Asynchronous Digital signal processors and System on a chip.

Bio-Health Informatics 
The Bio-Health Informatics Group (BHIG) conducts research in Bioinformatics and Health informatics ranging from the applications in molecular biology through to clinical e-science and healthcare applications. Academic staff in the group include Professor Andy Brass and Robert Stevens.

Formal Methods
The Formal Methods group has a very broad span of interests, ranging from developing the new mathematics of computational behaviour, to the study and development of system design and verification methods. There is a large group dedicated to the automation of logic including world-champion Vampire. The group is led by Professor  and includes Professor Peter Aczel, Professor Andrei Voronkov, Professor  amongst more than a dozen staff and a large number of research students.

Information Management
The Information Management Group (IMG) conducts basic and applied research into the design, development and use of data and knowledge management systems. Such research activities are broad in nature as well as scope, including basic research on models and languages that underpin activities on algorithms, technologies and architectures. Challenging applications motivate and validate this research, in particular the Semantic Web and e-Science. Examples of recent research include Protégé, Utopia Documents, myGrid, Taverna workbench, myExperiment, Open PHACTS. Academic staff in group include Professor Carole Goble CBE, Professor Norman Paton, Professor Ulrike Sattler, Professor Robert Stevens, Simon Harper, Rizos Sakelloirou, Sandra Sampaio and Ning Zhang.

Machine Learning and Optimisation
The Machine Learning and Optimisation (MLO) group conduct world-leading research into a wide range of techniques and applications of machine learning, optimization, data mining, probabilistic modelling, pattern recognition and machine perception. Academic staff include Jon Shapiro (group leader), Gavin Brown, Ke Chen, Richard Neville and Xiaojun Zeng.

Nano Engineering and Storage Technologies
The Nano Engineering and Storage Technologies (NEST) group has research interests in nano fabrication for data storage and advanced sensors applications and the investigation of data storage systems in general. The NEST group is housed in an integrated suite of staff offices, general-purpose laboratory space and class 100/1000 cleanrooms and is a founder member of the Manchester Centre for Mesoscience and Nanotechnology where the ground-breaking, Nobel Prize–winning work on graphene by Andre Geim and Konstantin Novoselov was undertaken. The group is led by Professor Thomas Thomson, academic staff members include Professor Jim Miles, Ernie W. Hill, Milan Mihajlovic and Paul W. Nutter.

Software Systems
The Software Systems group is concerned with the design, modelling, simulation and construction of mission-critical systems that challenge the states-of-the-art in both software engineering and performance engineering. Such systems are fundamentally composed of physically distributed component sub-systems, and are characterised by large data spaces and high compute needs, with associated complex interactions between the components. Academic staff members include Professor John Keane, Kung-Kiu Lau, Liping Zhao and Graham Riley.

Text Mining
The Text Mining group performs research to extract useful information and knowledge from unstructured text, particularly in the field of bioinformatics. The group also performs research into Natural Language Processing (NLP) and hosts the National Centre for Text Mining.

Advanced Interfaces
The Advanced Interfaces Group (AIG) researches virtual environments, collaborative visualization systems, and computer vision. The group is led by Steve Pettifer and includes academic staff Aphrodite Galata, Toby Howard (Honorary Reader), Tim Morris. Research projects include UTOPIA software.

Imaging Science
The Imaging sciences is part of the Centre for Imaging Sciences, a world-class research department focusing on imaging physics, image processing, computer vision, and the development and application of imaging biomarkers in healthcare. The group is run by Professor  jointly with the School of Medicine. The group includes Professor Tim Cootes.

Management
The school (and department) has been led by ten different Heads of School since its inception in 1964.

Heads of School/Department

The Department of Computer Science (in 2018, the School of Computer Science was turned into the Department of Computer Science) has been run by

  since 2022 

The School of Computer Science (2004–2018) was run by

 Robert Stevens 2016–2022 
 Jim Miles 2011–2016
 Norman Paton 2008–2011
 Chris Taylor 2004–2008

Prior to merger with UMIST, the School of Computer Science was the Department of Computer Science. It was run by 

 Steve Furber 2001–2004
 Brian Warboys 1996–2001
 Howard Barringer 1991–1996
 John Gurd 1987–1991
 Dai Edwards 1980–1987
 Tom Kilburn  1964–1980

History
The school has its roots in the Computer Group of the Electrical Engineering Department at the Victoria University of Manchester. The Computer Group was established following Freddie Williams's move to the Electrical Engineering Department in 1946. At its formation in 1964, the Department of Computer Science was the first such department in the United Kingdom, with Professor Tom Kilburn serving as Head of Department until 1980. On 1 May 2001, following the death of Kilburn the same year, the Computer Building was renamed Kilburn Building in his honour. The School of Computer Science was formed from the Department when the Victoria University of Manchester and UMIST merged to form the University of Manchester in 2004. It changed back from a school to a department in 2019. The Group/School/Department is notable for the following achievements:

 The world's first electronic stored-program digital computer (the Manchester Baby)
 Virtual memory using paging (see Atlas Computer)
 Manchester encoding
 The AMULET microprocessor series (asynchronous implementations of the ARM computer architecture)
See also the History of the school. The following alumni have been staff in the School

Alumni and Emeritus
The school and department has several notable alumni and Emeritus staff including:
 Terri Attwood, Emeritus Professor
 Alan Rector, Emeritus Professor 
 Roger Hubbold. Emeritus Professor 
 Jim Miles (retired)
  Allan M. Ramsay (retired)
 Ian Horrocks,  Professor of Computer Science at the University of Oxford
 Hilary Kahn, a professor in the computer science department
 Tom Kilburn  first head of the Department of Computer Science
 , Professor at the University of Birmingham
 Pedro Mendes, Professor at the University of Connecticut Health Center
 , Professor of Computational and Systems Biology in the School of Biological Sciences
 Neil Lawrence, DeepMind Professor of machine learning at the University of Cambridge
 Alan Turing  was deputy director of the computing laboratory and a Reader in the Mathematics Department
 Brian Warboys, Professor
 David Bree, Emeritus Professor of Artificial Intelligence
 Freddie Williams 
 Simon Lavington
 Geoff Tootill
 Nandini Mukherjee
 Ross D. King, creator of Robot Scientist, Department of Chemical Engineering and Biotechnology, University of Cambridge
 Ian Watson, and Emeritus Professor 
 Alasdair Rawsthorne
 Simon Segars CEO of Arm Ltd.
 Bonamy Grimes, co-founder of Skyscanner
 Gareth Williams, co-founder of Skyscanner
 Jon Andrews, vice president at Apple Inc

References

 
Manchester
Computer Science